World of Darkness is a series of tabletop role-playing games.

World of Darkness may also refer to:

World of Darkness (Mandaeism), the underworld in Mandaeism
World of Darkness (video game), a canceled video game
A World of Darkness, a game book
World of Darkness, a zoo exhibit at the Bronx Zoo#World of Darkness|Bronx Zoo]]